State Route 129 (SR 129) is a  state highway that travels southeast-to-northwest through portions of Evans, Tattnall, and Candler counties in the east-central part of the U.S. state of Georgia. It connects the towns of Claxton and Metter.

Route description
SR 129 begins just northwest of Fort Stewart, in rural Evans County, at an intersection with Old Hwy. 250 (former SR 250) and John Todd Road. The highway then heads northwest to an intersection with US 280/SR 30 (West Main Street) in Claxton, still within Evans County. It heads northwest to meet SR 169 and SR 169 Spur, north-northeast of Bellville. The highway continues to the northwest, cuts across the extreme northeastern corner of Tattnall County, and enters Candler County. During this stretch, it crosses over, but does not have an interchange with, Interstate 16 (Jim Gillis Historic Savannah Parkway). The roadway turns northward into Metter. It continues to the north until it meets its northern terminus, an intersection with SR 46 (East Broad Street).

SR 129 is not part of the National Highway System, a system of roadways important to the nation's economy, defense, and mobility.

Major intersections

See also

References

External links

 Georgia Roads (Routes 121 - 140)

129
Transportation in Evans County, Georgia
Transportation in Tattnall County, Georgia
Transportation in Candler County, Georgia